Trichocline is a genus of Australian and South American plants in the tribe Mutisieae within the family Asteraceae.  It consists of one species from Australia (T. spathulata) and twenty-three from South America.

Its closest relatives are Chaptalia, Gerbera, Leibnitzia, Perdicium, and Oreoseris.  Together they form the Gerbera complex in the tribe Mutisieae.

 Species

 formerly included
see Actinoseris Chaptalia Criscia Richterago Unxia

References 

Mutisieae
Asteraceae genera